S.E.S. Remixed - Dal Ri Gi/Just A Feeling is a remix album released by S.E.S. in 2002. It has sold approximately 3,000 copies. It includes remixes of two songs from their fifth album.

Track listing
 달리기 (J-Bait Disco Mix)
 Just A Feeling (Liquid Electro Mix)
 달리기 (Vibe 7 Bossa Nova Mix)
 Just A Feeling (Vibe 7 Timber Mix)
 달리기 (Gump Fusion Mix)
 Just A Feeling (Oliver Techno Mix)

External links 
 S.E.S.' Official Site 
 SM Entertainment's Official Site 

S.E.S. (group) albums
2002 remix albums
SM Entertainment remix albums